semaZen  (2002) is a 3D animation by Genco Gulan with a runtime of 2 minutes and 37 seconds. The video features a computer generated model of the artist, dressed in traditional Sufi clothing, weaved from the inside and outside the head in a constant loop which is unified with a continuous count to 41, in English and Turkish. The number 41 has a significance, as it is the number of times the God's name must be repeated in dhikr.

Semazen is the name for Whirling Dervishes in Sufi tradition. Gulan states that he was influenced by the software he used for creating 3D models. Software reminded him the constant revolve of the Whirling Dervishes and the tides between the inner and outer self.

References

Video art